Allium amethystinum is a plant species native to Italy, Greece, Turkey, Sicily, Crete, Malta, Albania, Bulgaria, and the former Yugoslavia, and cultivated elsewhere as an ornamental. It is one of several species that horticulturalists refer to as "drumstick onions" because of the tight spherical "knob" of flowers at the top, resembling a drumstick.

Allium amethystinum has a single bulb. Leaves are tubular, withering before flowering time. Flowers are reddish-purple, the tepals barely opening at flowering time, remaining wrapped around the ovary and filaments so that only the anthers and stigma are exposed.

References

amethystinum
Flora of Italy
Flora of Greece
Flora of Albania
Flora of Bulgaria
Flora of Sicily
Flora of Turkey
Flora of Crete
Flora of Yugoslavia
Onions
Plants described in 1828